Tirupati (rural) mandal is one of the 34 mandals in Tirupati district of Andhra Pradesh in India. It is under the administration of Tirupati revenue division and the headquarters are located at Tirupati.

History 
The mandal was a part of Chittoor district and was made a part of the newly formed Tirupati district on 4 April 2022 as part of reorganisation of the districts in the state by the Y. S. Jagan Mohan Reddy-led Government of Andhra Pradesh.

Geography 
The mandal is bounded by Chandragiri mandal, Ramachandrapuram mandal, Renigunta mandal, Tirupati (urban) mandal and Vadamalapeta mandal.

Demographics 
It had a sex ratio of 976. Scheduled Castes and Scheduled Tribes made up 18,934 and 3,933 of the population respectively. It had a literacy rate of 75.74% with 82.62% among males and 68.72% among females.

Administration 
The mandal is a part of the Tirupati revenue division. The headquarters are located at Tiruchanur.  census, the mandal comprises the following villages:

 Source: Election Commission 2021 (Villages)

 Source: Revenue Department of AP

Politics 
The mandal is one of the 7 mandals under Chandragiri Assembly constituency, which in turn is a part of Chittoor Lok Sabha constituency of Andhra Pradesh. , the mandal has 92,775 eligible voters with 46,173 male and 46,602 female voters. Chevireddy Bhaskar Reddy is representing the Chandragiri constituency as the Member of the Legislative Assembly (MLA) in Andhra Pradesh Legislative Assembly, and N. Reddeppa is representing the Chittoor constituency as the Member of Parliament (MP) in Lok Sabha.

References

Tirupati
Mandals in Tirupati district